Randall William Burke (born May 26, 1955) is a former American football player who played wide receiver in the National Football League (NFL) in the 1970s and 1980s. He played college football at the University of Kentucky and was drafted by the Baltimore Colts in the 1977 NFL Draft.

1955 births
Living people
Players of American football from Miami
American football wide receivers
Kentucky Wildcats football players
Baltimore Colts players